Xejk is a Maltese broadcast television station that airs a music television format. Programming consists primarily of music by Maltese and international artists, as well as talk shows and entertainment programs such as Just for Laughs: Gags.

The station was approved by the Malta Broadcasting Authority in 2009 and launched in 2010 under the name Calypso Music Television. It rebranded to its current name in 2013.

References

External links
 

2009 establishments in Malta
Music television channels
Television channels and stations established in 2009
Television stations in Malta
Music organisations based in Malta